Tommila is a Finnish surname.

Geographical distribution
As of 2014, 76.0% of all known bearers of the surname Tommila were residents of Finland (frequency 1:8,967), 16.7% of the United States (1:2,675,935), 4.7% of Sweden (1:259,125) and 1.0% of Estonia (1:165,209).

In Finland, the frequency of the surname was higher than national average (1:8,967) in the following regions:
 1. Satakunta (1:932)
 2. Kymenlaakso (1:3,165)
 3. Southwest Finland (1:7,196)

People
Päiviö Tommila (born 1931), Finnish historian 
Kielo Tommila (born 1950), Finnish film and stage actress
Juho Tommila (born 1993), Finnish ice hockey defenceman
Onni Tommila (born 1999), Finnish child actor

References

Finnish-language surnames
Surnames of Finnish origin